Charles Leonard Long was a Massachusetts lawyer, judge and politician who served as the Mayor of Springfield, Massachusetts in 1895.

Biography
Long was born in Lowell, Massachusetts on September 16, 1851.

He died at his home in Springfield on April 29, 1930.

Notes

1851 births
1930 deaths
Harvard Law School alumni
Massachusetts lawyers
Springfield, Massachusetts City Council members
Mayors of Springfield, Massachusetts
Massachusetts Republicans
19th-century American politicians
19th-century American lawyers